Elmer Ellsworth Wilson (December 31, 1894 – November 20, 1969) was an American Negro league second baseman in the 1920s.

A native of St. Louis, Missouri, Wilson made his Negro leagues debut in 1921 with the Detroit Stars and the Cleveland Tate Stars. He went on to play for the St. Louis Giants, St. Louis Stars, and Dayton Marcos through 1926, and later managed the Seattle Royal Giants. Wilson died in St. Louis in 1969 at age 74.

References

External links
 and Seamheads

1894 births
1969 deaths
Dayton Marcos players
Detroit Stars players
St. Louis Giants (1924) players
St. Louis Stars (baseball) players
Cleveland Tate Stars players
20th-century African-American sportspeople
Baseball infielders